Written in the Sand may refer to:

Written in the Sand (album), album by The Michael Schenker group 1996
"Written in the Sand", song by The Michael Schenker group from Written in the Sand 1996
"Written in the Sand" (song), song by American country music group Old Dominion 2017
"Written in the Sand", song by Birdy Nam Nam from the album Defiant Order 2011
"Written In The Sand", Philippines entry in BBC 2000 millennium broadcast, sung by Regine Velasquez 2000
Written in the Sand, 1912 novel by G. R. Duval